Polish Canadians are citizens of Canada with Polish ancestry, and Poles who immigrated to Canada from abroad. At the 2016 Census, there were 1,106,585 Canadians who claimed full or partial Polish heritage.

History

The first Polish immigrant on record, was Dominik Barcz, came to Canada in 1752. He was a fur merchant from Gdańsk who settled in Montreal. He was followed in 1757 by Charles Blaskowicz, a deputy surveyor-general of lands. In 1776 arrived army surgeon, August Franz Globensky. His grandson, Charles Auguste Maximilien Globensky, was elected to the House of Commons in Ottawa in 1875.

Among the earliest Polish immigrants to Canada were members of the Watt and De Meuron military regiments from Saxony and Switzerland sent overseas to help the British Army in North America. Several were émigrés who took part in the November Uprising of 1830 and the 1863 insurrection against the Russian Empire in the Russian sector of partitioned Poland.

In 1841, Casimir Stanislaus Gzowski arrived in Canada from partitioned Poland via the US, and for 50 years worked in the engineering, military and community sectors in Toronto and Southern Ontario, for which he was knighted by Queen Victoria. His great-grandson, Peter Gzowski, became one of Canada's famous radio personalities.

Charles Horecki immigrated in 1872. He was an engineer with the cross-Canada railway construction from Edmonton to the Pacific Ocean through the Peace River Valley. Today, a mountain and a body of water in British Columbia are named after him.

Polish immigration stopped during World War I and between the wars, over 100,000 Polish immigrants arrived in Canada.

Group-settlers

The first significant group of Polish group-settlers were ethnic Kashubians from northern Poland, who were escaping Prussian and German oppression resulting from the occupation after the partitions. They arrived in Renfrew County of Ontario in 1858, where they founded the settlements of Wilno, Barry's Bay, and Round Lake. By 1890 there were about 270 Kashubian families working in the Madawaska Valley of Renfrew County, mostly in the lumber industry of the Ottawa Valley

The consecutive waves of Polish immigrants in periods from 1890–1914, 1920–1939, and 1941 to this day, settled across Canada from Cape Breton to Vancouver, and made numerous and significant contributions to the agricultural, manufacturing, engineering, teaching, publishing, religious, mining, cultural, professional, sports, military, research, business, governmental and political life in Canada.

Geographical distribution 
Data from this section from Statistics Canada, 2021.

Provinces & territories

Religious services
All Polish Canadians including their descendants are encouraged by organizations such as the Congress, to preserve their background and retain some ties with Poland and its people. In the past, the most significant role in the preservation of various aspects of Polish traditions and customs among the Polish communities in Canada fell for the Polish urban parishes, which retain the use of the Polish language during services.

The first Polish Catholic priest visited Polish immigrants in 1862 in Kitchener. The first church serving Polish immigrants was built in 1875 in Wilno, Ontario. In Winnipeg, the Holy Ghost Church was built in 1899 with the church in Winnipeg publishing the first Polish newspaper in Canada, Gazeta Katolicka in 1908. In Sydney, Nova Scotia, St. Mary's Polish Parish was established in 1913 by immigrant steelworkers and coal miners, many of whom had previously formed the St. Michael's Polish Benefit Society (est. 1909). The parish remains the only Polish parish in Atlantic Canada, although there is a Polish mission (St. Faustina) in Halifax.

The first Polish-Canadian Roman Catholic bishop is Reverend Mathew Ustrzycki, consecrated in June 1985, auxiliary bishop of the Hamilton Diocese. There are Polish-Canadian priests in many congregations and orders, such as the Franciscans, Jesuits, Redemptorists, Saletinians, Resurrectionists, Oblates, Michaelites, and the Society of Christ. In addition, 80 priests serve in 120 parishes.

Largest Polish Canadian communities

Polish Canadian organizations
 Canadian Polish Congress
 Polish Culture Society of Edmonton
 Polish National Union of Canada
 Konekt
 Polycultural Immigrant and Community Services
 Canadian Polish Research Institute
 Poland in the Rockies
 The Polish Institute of Arts and Sciences in Canada
 Canadian Federation of Polish Women
 Federation of Polish Jews of Canada

Recognition

The Victoria Cross
Numerous Polish-Canadians have been recognized with awards and appointments by the Queen and the Canadian governments as well as universities and various organizations. One of the most notable recipients was Andrew Mynarski, pilot-gunner from Winnipeg, awarded the Victoria Cross posthumously for extreme valor in World War II.

The Order of Canada
Mary Adamowska Panaro, C.M. Winnipeg, Welfare Council of Winnipeg
Dr. Henry Wojcicki – Edmonton, distinguished psychiatrist, University of Alberta senator

Dr.Tom Brzustowski Waterloo, president of NSERC
Walter Gretzky, Brantford, Ontario, Canada

Judges
Their Honours 
Judge Paul Staniszewski – of  Toronto, Montreal and the County Court of Windsor
Judge Alfred Harold Joseph Swencisky – of the Superior Court of BC in Vancouver; past president of the Vancouver Hospital Association
Judge P. Swiecicki – of the Superior Court of BC in Vancouver
Judge Allan H. J. Wachowich – of the Court of Queen's Bench in Edmonton
Chief Judge Edward R. Wachowich - of the Provincial Court of Alberta (deceased 2012)
Judge E.F. Wrzeszczinski-Wren – of the County Court of Toronto (deceased)

Notable Polish Canadians

See also

 Canada–Poland relations
 Great Emigration
 Canadian-Polish Congress
 Polish Culture Society of Edmonton
 Polish Americans
 Polish Cathedral style, North America
 Polish British
 Polish Australians
 Polish Brazilians
 Kashubians § Diaspora

References

External links
 Polonia Edmonton
 History of Ours: the Polish Community in Brantford - Brantford library
 
 Zwiazkowiec (Alliancer), 1935–1978 digitized issues of Toronto newspaper - Multicultural Canada

European Canadian
 
 
Canada
Polish